The 1988 Scottish Superprix, saw the cars from the British Formula Three series visit Knockhill, north of Dunfermline, for a non-championship race, on 7 August.

Report

Entry
A total of just eight F3 cars were entered for this the first of two non-British Championship races in 1988.

Qualifying
Gary Brabham took pole position for Jack Brabham Racing team in their Volkswagen-engined Ralt RT32, averaging a speed of 89.821 mph.

Race
The race was held over 25 laps of the Knockhill circuit. Gary Brabham took the winner spoils for the Jack Brabham Racing team, driving their Ralt-Volkswagen RT32. The Australian won in a time of 22:10.8mins., averaging a speed of 87.911 mph. Second place went to Ross Hockenhull in Bowman Racing’s Ralt-Volkswagen RT32, who was 5.1s behind. The Reynard 873 of Scott Stringfellow completed the podium for the Jim Lee Racing.

Classification

Race

 Fastest lap: Gary Brabham, 52.5ecs. (89.137 mph)

References

British Formula Three Championship